Kurban Alievich Shiraev (born 28 March 1999) is a Russian freestyle wrestler of Avar ethnicity who competes at 65 and 70 kilograms. The 2020 European Continental champion, Shiraev is a two–time Ivan Yarygin Golden Grand Prix gold medalist (2020 and 2021) and a two–time Russian National Championship medalist (2020 and 2021).

Career 
Shiraev's first international appearance took place in Subotica, where he competed at the 2015 Cadet European Championships in the 42 kilograms division. He placed fifteenth at the tournament and took a long break that lasted until late 2018. Despite being eligible to compete at the junior level, he made his return at the '18 Intercontinental Cup as a senior. He earned a bronze medal and so he did at the 2019's Ali Aliev Tournament and Ugra Cup, also adding a silver medal from the '19 Junior World Championships and the '18 and 19's Alans Tournament. All of his senior level losses from 2018 to 2019 came from prestigious wrestlers, such as Soslan Ramonov ('16 Olympic Gold Medalist), Aleksandr Bogomoev ('15 European Games champion), Bajrang Punia ('18 Asian Games champion) and Ismail Musukaev ('15 Russian National runner-up).

In January 2020, he competed at the Ivan Yarygin Golden Grand Prix, where he went on to defeat multiple opponents on his way to the finale, most notably Nachyn Kuular ('17 U23 World Champion). In the finals, he avenged a loss from 2019 by upsetting former World and Olympic champion Soslan Ramonov and winning the championship. He then competed at the European Championships, where he defeated four opponents to win the European title at 65 kilograms.

He came back on 17 October 2020 at the Russian Nationals, in where he placed third. After opening up with two pins, he was dominantly defeated by returning National and World Champion David Baev in the quarterfinals. He was able to earn the bronze medal after defeating two more opponents.

After competing at the WLR Pro League on 25 January 2021 and losing once again to David Baev, Shiraev moved down to 65 kilos and placed third at the Russian National tournament.

Major results

Freestyle record 

! colspan="7"| Senior Freestyle Matches
|-
!  Res.
!  Record
!  Opponent
!  Score
!  Date
!  Event
!  Location
|-
! style=background:white colspan=7 |
|-
|Win
|40–8
|align=left| Victor Rassadin
|style="font-size:88%"|8–1
|style="font-size:88%" rowspan=5|27–28 May 2021
|style="font-size:88%" rowspan=5|Golden Grand Prix Ivan Yarygin 2021
|style="text-align:left;font-size:88%;" rowspan=5|
 Krasnoyarsk, Russia
|-
|Win
|39–8
|align=left| Abdula Akhmedov
|style="font-size:88%"|Fall
|-
|Win
|38–8
|align=left| David Baev
|style="font-size:88%"|8–7
|-
|Win
|37–8
|align=left| Abdulkerim Abdulaev
|style="font-size:88%"|7–0
|-
|Win
|36–8
|align=left| Buianto Banzaraktsaev
|style="font-size:88%"|TF 11–0
|-
! style=background:white colspan=7 |
|-
|Win
|35–8
|align=left| Gadzhimurad Omarov
|style="font-size:88%"|3–0
|style="font-size:88%" rowspan=5|13–14 March 2021
|style="font-size:88%" rowspan=5|2021 Russian National Freestyle Wrestling Championships
|style="text-align:left;font-size:88%;" rowspan=5|
 Ulan-Ude, Russia
|-
|Loss
|34–8
|align=left| Zagir Shakhiev
|style="font-size:88%"|3–6
|-
|Win
|34–7
|align=left| Akhmed Chakaev
|style="font-size:88%"|3–0
|-
|Win
|33–7
|align=left| Saiyn Kazyryk
|style="font-size:88%"|8–0
|-
|Win
|32–7
|align=left| Muslim Sadulaev
|style="font-size:88%"|8–1
|-
! style=background:white colspan=7 |
|-
|Loss
|31–7
|align=left| David Baev
|style="font-size:88%"|4–6
|style="font-size:88%"|25 January 2021
|style="font-size:88%"|WLR Pro League I
|style="text-align:left;font-size:88%;" |
 Russia
|-
! style=background:white colspan=7 |
|-
|Win
|31-6
|align=left| Arbak Sat
|style="font-size:88%"|6-0
|style="font-size:88%" rowspan=5|17 October 2020
|style="font-size:88%" rowspan=5|2020 Russian National Freestyle Wrestling Championships
|style="text-align:left;font-size:88%;" rowspan=5| Naro-Fominsk, Russia
|-
|Win
|30-6
|align=left|
|style="font-size:88%"|4-1
|-
|Loss
|29-6
|align=left| David Baev
|style="font-size:88%"|0-8
|-
|Win
|29-5
|align=left| Ildus Giniyatullin
|style="font-size:88%"|Fall
|-
|Win
|28-5
|align=left| Aleksey Borovitsky
|style="font-size:88%"|Fall
|-
! style=background:white colspan=7 |
|-
|Win
|27-5
|align=left| Niurgun Skriabin
|style="font-size:88%"|5-0
|style="font-size:88%" rowspan=4|10–16 February 2020
|style="font-size:88%" rowspan=4|2020 European Wrestling Championships
|style="text-align:left;font-size:88%;" rowspan=4| Rome, Italy
|-
|Win
|26-5
|align=left| Erik Arushanian
|style="font-size:88%"|9-2
|-
|Win
|25-5
|align=left| Niklas Dorn
|style="font-size:88%"|6-3
|-
|Win
|24-5
|align=left| Marwane Yezza
|style="font-size:88%"|TF 10-0
|-
! style=background:white colspan=7 |
|-
|Win
|23-5
|align=left| Soslan Ramonov
|style="font-size:88%"|4-2
|style="font-size:88%" rowspan=6|23–26 January 2020
|style="font-size:88%" rowspan=6|2020 Ivan Yarygin Golden Grand Prix
|style="text-align:left;font-size:88%;" rowspan=6|
 Krasnoyarsk, Russia
|-
|Win
|22-5
|align=left| Nachyn Kuular
|style="font-size:88%"|5-1
|-
|Win
|21-5
|align=left| Artur Badtiev
|style="font-size:88%"|2-2
|-
|Win
|20-5
|align=left| Maxim Sacultan
|style="font-size:88%"|3-1
|-
|Win
|19-5
|align=left| Rifat Saibotalov
|style="font-size:88%"|3-1
|-
|Win
|18-5
|align=left| Nyamdorj Battulga
|style="font-size:88%"|8-1
|-
! style=background:white colspan=7 |
|-
|Loss
|17-5
|align=left| Soslan Ramonov
|style="font-size:88%"|0-3
|style="font-size:88%" rowspan=5|7–8 December 2019
|style="font-size:88%" rowspan=5|2019 Alans International Tournament
|style="text-align:left;font-size:88%;" rowspan=5|
 Vladikavkaz, Russia
|-
|Win
|17-4
|align=left| Saiyn Kazyryk
|style="font-size:88%"|TF 10-0
|-
|Win
|16-4
|align=left| Amirmohammad Babak Yazdanicherati
|style="font-size:88%"|TF 10-0
|-
|Win
|15-4
|align=left| Batoev Bulat
|style="font-size:88%"|TF 11-1
|-
|Win
|14-4
|align=left| Shamil Guseinov
|style="font-size:88%"|3-0
|-
! style=background:white colspan=7 |
|-
|Win
|13-4
|align=left| Ashamaz Kardanov
|style="font-size:88%"|9-4
|style="font-size:88%" rowspan=4|24–28 October 2019
|style="font-size:88%" rowspan=4|2019 Prix of Vladimir Semenov "Ugra Cup"
|style="text-align:left;font-size:88%;" rowspan=4|
 Nefteyugansk, Russia
|-
|Win
|12-4
|align=left| Sanzhar Doszhanov
|style="font-size:88%"|Fall
|-
|Loss
|11-4
|align=left| Aleksandr Bogomoev
|style="font-size:88%"|1-4
|-
|Win
|11-3
|align=left| Savr Shalburov
|style="font-size:88%"|TF 11-0
|-
! style=background:white colspan=7 |
|-
|Win
|10-3
|align=left| Islam Dudaev
|style="font-size:88%"|6-6
|style="font-size:88%" rowspan=4|1–3 May 2019
|style="font-size:88%" rowspan=4|2019 Ali Aliev Tournament
|style="text-align:left;font-size:88%;" rowspan=4|
 Kaspiysk, Russia
|-
|Win
|9-3
|align=left| Meirzhan Ashirov
|style="font-size:88%"|1-2
|-
|Loss
|8-3
|align=left| Bajrang Punia
|style="font-size:88%"|0-4
|-
|Win
|8-2
|align=left| Muslimbek Abdurashidov
|style="font-size:88%"|4-0
|-
! style=background:white colspan=7 |
|-
|Loss
|7-2
|align=left| Muslim Sadulaev
|style="font-size:88%"|4-8
|style="font-size:88%" rowspan=5|7–9 December 2018
|style="font-size:88%" rowspan=5|2018 Alans International Tournament
|style="text-align:left;font-size:88%;" rowspan=5|
 Vladikavkaz, Russia
|-
|Win
|7-1
|align=left| Artur Badtiev
|style="font-size:88%"|3-0
|-
|Win
|6-1
|align=left| Nachyn Kuular
|style="font-size:88%"|6-1
|-
|Win
|5-1
|align=left| Viktor Rassadin
|style="font-size:88%"|Fall
|-
|Win
|4-1
|align=left| Viktor Serada
|style="font-size:88%"|TF 13-2
|-
! style=background:white colspan=7 |
|-
|Win
|3-1
|align=left| Biysultan Arslanov
|style="font-size:88%"|Fall
|style="font-size:88%" rowspan=4|15–19 November 2018
|style="font-size:88%" rowspan=4|2018 Intercontinental Wrestling Cup
|style="text-align:left;font-size:88%;" rowspan=4|
 Khasavyurt, Russia
|-
|Loss
|2-1
|align=left| Ismail Musukaev
|style="font-size:88%"|1-2
|-
|Win
|2-0
|align=left| Murshid Mutalimov
|style="font-size:88%"|6-3
|-
|Win
|1-0
|align=left| Rustam Gaimasov
|style="font-size:88%"|Fall
|-

References

External links 

 

Living people
1999 births
Russian male sport wrestlers
European Wrestling Championships medalists
People from Kazbekovsky District
Sportspeople from Dagestan
Avar people
European Wrestling Champions
20th-century Russian people
21st-century Russian people